The Ordeal of Dr. Mudd is a 1980 historical drama film directed by Paul Wendkos. Based on a true story, it revolves around the 1865 assassination of Abraham Lincoln. Dennis Weaver plays the lead role of Dr. Samuel A. Mudd, who was imprisoned for conspiring with John Wilkes Booth in the killing.

In 1979, during the filming of the movie on Monterey Square in Savannah, Georgia, preservationist and antiques dealer Jim Williams hung a flag of Nazi Germany outside of a window at his Mercer House home in an attempt to disrupt the shoot, after the film company declined to make a donation to the local humane society, as Williams had requested. The Congregation Mickve Israel, located across the square, complained to the city. Williams was later the main subject of John Berendt's 1994 book Midnight in the Garden of Good and Evil.

At the end of the film, a written message appears, incorrectly stating that President Jimmy Carter gave Mudd a posthumous pardon.

Cast

References

External links 

 

1980 films
1980s English-language films
1980s American films
Films shot in Savannah, Georgia
CBS network films